Jonathon Hunt (born July 1, 1981 in Rochester, Michigan, United States) is a retired American pair skater. With partner Laura Handy, he is the 2000 Karl Shafer Memorial champion and the 2001 Nebelhorn Trophy bronze medalist. With partner Jennifer Don, he is the 2003 World Junior bronze medalist, the 2003 Junior Grand Prix bronze medalist, and the 2004 U.S. national pewter medalist. Don & Hunt announced the end of their partnership on March 8, 2005.

Hunt previously competed with Jessica Hunt and Abbi Gleeson. He also competed as a singles skater on the novice level.

Results

Men's singles

Pairs with Handy

Pairs with Gleeson

Pairs with Don

References

External links
 
 

American male pair skaters
1981 births
Living people
World Junior Figure Skating Championships medalists
20th-century American people
21st-century American people